Radio in Sydney became a popular tool for politics, news, religion, and sport and has managed to survive despite the introduction of television and the internet. The first long range (520 km) coastal radio station was established in 1911. In 1921, amateur radio broadcasters commenced transition. The first radio licence in Australia was granted to Charles Maclurcan for station 2CM. Commencing in 1923, 2SB is the second official station to be licensed. Sydney's first official station 2FC commenced service in 1924. In 1935, the studios of the ABC install a disc recorder, enabling the recording of programs to occur for the first time. Talk radio was introduced on 2SM in 1967. In 1974, 2MBS commences broadcasting as the first full-time FM station in Australia, playing classical music 24 hours a day. Finally, in 1975, multicultural radio is launched with the formation of 2EA.

Notes
 Historically, many Australian broadcast stations had no names other than their official callsigns. In this case the Station name is left blank.
 Other stations have had several names. These names are all listed.
 If the station is still broadcasting under the same callsign and mode of transmission, the Last broadcast is left blank.
 If the callsign and/or mode of transmission has changed, the new data is presented on a new row of the table, and the name or callsign of the new station is shown in the Succeeded by column, which is otherwise blank.
 Sydney radio stations are surveyed 8 times per year by Commercial Radio Australia as part of the national radio ratings surveys.

Stations
AM and FM stations with an asterisk are also available on digital (DAB+) radio

AM

FM

Digital radio
Digital radio in Australia uses the DAB+ standard and is available in Sydney, Melbourne, Brisbane, Perth, Adelaide, Canberra and Darwin. The national government owned networks, the ABC and SBS, and the commercial radio stations in each market provide many of their services and a few digital-only services on the digital platform. Australia uses the AAC+ codec provided with upgraded DAB+ standard.

See also
List of radio stations in Australia
Culture of Sydney
Music of Australia
History of broadcasting in Australia

References

External links
The Australian Radio Guide – AM
The Australian Radio Guide – FM
Listen to Sydney radio stations LIVE

Radio stations in Sydney

Culture of Sydney
Sydney-related lists